The 2013 Tour de Suisse was the 77th running of the Tour de Suisse cycling stage race. It started on 8 June with an individual time trial in Quinto and ended on 16 June after another individual time trial in Flumserberg; in total, the race consisted of nine stages. It was the seventeenth race of the 2013 UCI World Tour season.

Costa was also the winner of the race's queen stage two days prior, winning into La Punt. Costa's winning margin over runner-up Bauke Mollema of  – a stage winner during the race, winning the second stage – was sixty-two seconds, while the podium was completed by 's Roman Kreuziger, eight seconds down on Mollema and seventy behind Costa.

In the race's other classifications,  rider Robert Vrečer was the winner of both the mountains and the sprints classifications, having featured in several breakaways during the nine-day race. Peter Sagan again won the points classification, and was the only other rider to win multiple stages during the event.  finished at the head of the teams classification, for the second successive year.

Teams
As the Tour de Suisse was a UCI World Tour event, all UCI ProTeams were invited automatically and obligated to send a squad. Originally, eighteen ProTeams were scheduled to be invited to the race, with two other squads – , and  – given wildcard places, and as such, would have formed the event's 20-team peloton.  subsequently regained their ProTour status after an appeal to the Court of Arbitration for Sport. With  not originally invited to the race, race organisers announced their inclusion to the race, bringing the total number of teams competing to twenty-one.

The 21 teams that competed in the race were:

The  had two previous riders among their octet; Vladimir Karpets, who won the race in 2007, served as one of the domestiques for the defending race-winner Rui Costa.

Race overview

Stages

Stage 1
8 June 2013 — Quinto, individual time trial (ITT)

After three years of opening with an individual time trial stage around the city of Lugano, the municipality of Quinto played host to the opening salvo of the 2013 edition of the Tour de Suisse. Race organisers expected the best time for the stage to be beneath the ten-minute barrier, with a time of 9' 55".

 rider Yannick Talabardon was the first rider into the stage, and he recorded a time of 10' 32", which was instantaneously beaten by the next rider on the road, Reto Hollenstein of the  team; Hollenstein recorded a time exactly equal to the organisers' predicted winning time of 9' 55". However, Hollenstein was not to win with such a time, as after half an hour with the best time, Alex Rasmussen knocked a second off the best time. Although not the fastest through the intermediate time-check, Meyer crossed the line in a time of 9' 39", beating Rasmussen's time by fifteen seconds over the course. A shift in wind direction aided Meyer's bid to win the stage, and after two hours passed, Meyer was able to take the stage victory, and the first yellow jersey. Several of the main contenders for the stage were caught out by the wind; Fabian Cancellara lost 22 seconds to Meyer, while 's Peter Sagan just broke the top 40 in the stage results, as he lost 35 seconds over the course.

Stage 2
9 June 2013 — Ulrichen to Crans-Montana, 

The amendment was due to heavy snow on what was due to be the first categorised climb of the race, the Nufenen Pass, which had made the roads impassable. The stage start was moved to Ulrichen, which had been due to be the first town in which the peloton would have passed on the descent from the climb. The new parcours was largely downhill to start, before flattening out; it passed through two intermediate sprint points at Sierre and Sion before reaching the first-category climb to Crans-Montana.

After a quick opening to the stage, the breakaway was formed inside the opening  of racing.  rider Enrique Sanz was joined by 's Christophe Riblon, Adrián Sáez and Johannes Fröhlinger of  made up the group, and managed to accrue a maximum advantage of approaching three minutes around halfway through the stage. Sanz led the group through each of the intermediate sprint points, as the peloton started to close on the lead quartet. Riblon attacked his companions with around  remaining, but he was caught several kilometres later, and the group as a whole were caught just as the final climb commenced.  led onto the climb, with Thibaut Pinot expected to challenge for the stage. Dan Martin launched the first major attack on the ascent, with his team-mate Ryder Hesjedal eventually bridging up to him with three other riders.

A high pace that was being set by the  duo reduced the group of five to just three, with only  rider Tanel Kangert being able to stick within the small group, which was around fifteen seconds ahead of the main field. Hesjedal then took the front, and Martin dropped back, which allowed the gap to further extend up to half a minute with around  remaining. Hesjedal kicked on from Kangert a couple of kilometres later, and led across the line in which mountains classification points were being offered. Mollema closed in on Hesjedal inside the final kilometre, and accelerated away to claim his first stage victory since the 2010 Tour de Pologne, despite receiving a 20-second penalty post-stage for receiving a bidon in an area too close to the finish. Overnight leader Cameron Meyer was able to maintain the yellow jersey by three seconds from Hesjedal.

Stage 3
10 June 2013 — Montreux to Meiringen, 

The third stage of the race was a transitional stage, starting from Montreux alongside the banks of Lake Geneva and heading north towards Bern on an undulating route. This route included a third-category climb at the Chemin de Lorette in Fribourg, as it meandered its way towards the stage finish at Meiringen. Prior to reaching Meiringen for the first time, an intermediate sprint point was passed in the village of Brienz, on the northern shore of Lake Brienz. At Meiringen, there was a short, punchy fourth-category climb at the Grimselstrasse, a  climb of 5.6% in gradient, and after another intermediate sprint at Innertkirchen, set the riders up for the day's major ascent. A fast, technical descent – with speeds reaching a maximum of around  – followed the summit, and brought the riders back to Meiringen, where the final  of racing were flat, with straight roads.

With heavy rain on the route, the peloton went through a testing portion of the course in the opening kilometres and enabled the group to split apart for a period before reforming several kilometres later. On the climb at the Chemin de Lorette, the breakaway formed with eighteen riders heading up the road ahead of the peloton. Despite such a large group going ahead, the peloton – being led by the  team – kept the lead gap in check at between three and three-and-a-half minutes. The group started to splinter as it headed towards Meiringen for the first time, while in the peloton, Ryder Hesjedal, who had been lying second place overall, crashed out of the race. He was taken to hospital, where he was diagnosed with "multiple contusions and abrasions", but no fractured bones. The nine leaders crossed the finish line in Meiringen ahead of the closing  loop, and held a lead of around two minutes over the peloton.

's pace on the front with Tejay van Garderen and Mathias Frank had reduced the group to around fifteen riders, with yellow jersey wearer Cameron Meyer among those dropped. The groups merged towards the top, where Breschel's team-mate Roman Kreuziger attacked clear, with 's Peter Sagan, Frank and Rui Costa of the  bridged across. The four riders remained off the front until the finish, where Sagan out-sprinted the rest for his seventh career victory at the Tour de Suisse. Fourth place for Frank was good enough for him to claim the race leader's yellow jersey; his first race lead at his home Tour.

Stage 4
11 June 2013 — Innertkirchen to Buochs, 

The fourth stage of the race was one of a select few to be aimed towards the sprinters that took to the start at the commencement of the race in Quinto. Starting in Innertkirchen, the opening quarter of the stage was relatively flat prior to the first of the day's three categorised climbs, a second-category climb at Schwanden. A two-part descent with a long period of flat during it, the route returned to flatter ground in Heimberg. An undulating next  followed, passing through the first intermediate sprint in Schüpfheim. The intermediate sprint was closely followed by the second-category Rengg ascent, which was seen as a pivotal part of the route, as its steepness was certain to test some sprinters and their endurance towards the finish. From the descent, it was almost flat all the way to Buochs, save for a fourth-category kicker – the Rengglochstrasse – near Kriens; the finish was also technical, with a testing 90-degree left-hand turn with just  remaining.

The lead trio built up an advantage on the road of over four minutes, before the sprinters' teams set about reducing the advantage ahead of the finish. Kaisen was dropped on the Rengglochstrasse, with the main field within two minutes of the two remaining leaders on the road. Voigt and Vrečer had to momentarily stop for a closed level crossing just inside of the final , as their lead was cut to around thirty seconds. This ultimately set up the sprint finish, where 's Arnaud Démare reached the final left-hand turn first, and managed to fend off a quick-finishing Matthew Goss to take the stage win.

Stage 5
12 June 2013 — Buochs to Leuggern, 

The midway point of the race was marked with a stage heading from Buochs towards the outskirts of Lucerne, bypassing it around Horw and Malters. Having navigated their way around, the peloton continued directly north on their  parcours, towards the Swiss-German border and a finishing circuit around Leuggern. Around two-and-a-half laps were completed of the  circuit, with five categorised climbs (all fourth-category) and two intermediate sprints to be contested in Döttingen, prior to the finish in Leuggern itself. Of the five climbs, only two different hills were ascented; the Zurziberg was tackled three times on the route, while the Loorweg was climbed twice, but neither were expected to distance the sprinters, with average gradients of 5% apiece.

Behind, Giovanni Visconti, who had been lying in fourth place overall, exited the race with serious bruising and skin loss, after a crash. On the first full lap of the closing circuit,  rider Michael Mørkøv attacked on the Zurziberg, and managed to pull clear by around 30 seconds on the climb itself. Further round the circuit, several riders hit the tarmac, as the peloton was forced to narrowly pass parked cars at the side of the road;  rider Jens Debusschere suffered the worst of the injuries, and although he was able to finish the stage, he withdrew following it after he was diagnosed with a fractured ulna.

Mørkøv's foray off the front of the peloton was not to last, and he was caught by the peloton, who crossed the finish line in Leuggern for the second time, just thirty seconds behind the four leaders. The leaders tried to up the pace on the Loorweg, but were caught even before they had reached the summit of the climb.  led through the second intermediate sprint in protection of their race leader Mathias Frank, before  took up the front, ahead of the final ascent of the Zurziberg. 's Jorge Azanza tried to go clear on the climb, but was caught prior to gaining a substantial advantage. This ultimately led to the final sprint;  had led into the final kilometre, with  chasing for Sagan, but with a lack of team-mates, he had to chase down the sprint first. 's Alexander Kristoff moved ahead of him, and went on to take his first World Tour victory by around a bike length, ahead of Sagan and  rider Arnaud Démare.

Stage 6
13 June 2013 — Leuggern to Meilen, 

The sixth stage of the race started in the previous day's finishing town of Leuggern and headed predominantly south-east away from the town. The first came at Küsnacht, after the race had made its way through Zurich, and continued alongside the banks of Lake Zurich. Having headed inland for the second climb – the Limberg, with gradients of up to 11% – the race moved back towards the Lake itself, passing through the second intermediate sprint at Oetwil am See; the race continued along the banks of the Lake until the finish in Meilen.

The day's breakaway took some time in forming, with around  having been completed before the move was instigated. Four riders went clear and were given the blessing by the peloton to go clear and establish an advantage. With no threats to the classification, the peloton elected not to chase down the lead four, and instead let them battle it out for stage honours. Their maximum lead hit quarter of an hour, but was under eleven by the time the field had reached the finish. Rast launched an opportunist move at the flamme rouge and was not chased down, to take his first Tour de Suisse stage win. Hayman and Kolobnev came in 25 seconds, with Grabsch at 28 seconds. The field came in with  rider Peter Sagan leading home in fifth place, 10' 43" behind Rast, and in the process, extending his points classification lead.

Stage 7
14 June 2013 — Meilen to La Punt, 

The queen stage of the 2013 Tour de Suisse, the seventh stage had a somewhat docile start to its  itinerary. After moving towards the Prättigau valley, the first-category Prättigaustrasse was the first to be tackled; a climb of two halves, with a steady start and then a 7% kick up to the summit. After passing through the two intermediate sprints at Alvaneu and Bergün respectively, the climb had irregular gradients throughout; shallow to start with, portions of the climb averaged 10%. The descent was not too technical, despite a series of hairpin bends, but the closing metres were flat in La Punt.

Mini-attacks were key to the first hour and a half of racing, but the breakaway did not establish until almost  were completed. Fourteen riders went clear of the field, with the best placed among them being  rider Luis León Sánchez, who trailed the overnight leader of the general classification, Mathias Frank, by almost six-and-a-half minutes. The group managed to build up a lead of around five-and-a-half minutes at its maximum, but was around a quarter of that by the time the leaders reached the final climb of the day, the Albula Pass. Sánchez and 's Georg Preidler attacked at the foot of the climb, while out of the peloton came a separate solo attack by 's Joe Dombrowski. Dombrowski soon caught up to the remnants of the breakaway group, before moving past them with fresher legs.

Sánchez and Preidler were soon caught by the peloton, with the former's  team setting the pace on the front of the main field, as they started to close on Dombrowski. Dan Martin also joined the group for a period – making a sextet after Dombrowski had been caught near the top – but he was dropped along with Dombrowski towards the top of the climb, and on the descent. Pinot and Mollema were gapped by van Garderen and Costa, but Mollema was able to rejoin the lead pair, after an inflatable arch – which had been erected to signify two kilometres left to race – had collapsed onto the road. The trio remained together down to La Punt, where Costa prevailed in a close sprint, ahead of Mollema and van Garderen. Frank finished 22 seconds behind Costa to maintain the race lead, but by a reduced margin of 13 seconds.

Stage 8
15 June 2013 — Zernez to Bad Ragaz, 

The race steadily rose towards the first of two categorised climbs on the route, passing through the previous day's stage finish of La Punt, and also St. Moritz, before the ascent of the Julier Pass. The climb started at Silvaplana, and climbed almost  to the summit, at an average gradient of around 6.6%. From there, a  descent followed, taking the race back down to flatter grounds at Rhäzüns. After contesting the first intermediate sprint just outside Chur, the riders passed through the finish line in Bad Ragaz for the first time, prior to a  closing loop. The second intermediate sprint came shortly after the line in Sargans, taking in several kilometres in Liechtenstein, prior to the third-category kicker at the St. Luzisteig Pass – with a maximum gradient of 12% – just  from the finish. A fast descent followed, before the final  were flat.

Vrečer led the group over the Julier Pass, where the quartet enjoyed their largest advantage of the day, at almost five-and-a-half minutes.

With  on the front, their team leader Cameron Meyer suffered a puncture prior to the final climb; the resultant time gap was too much for him to bridge back to, and he ultimately lost almost half a minute to the peloton by stage's end. 's Philippe Gilbert tried to launch an attack not long after – the incumbent world champion looking to take his first victory in the rainbow jersey – but he was brought back by Sagan's team. It ultimately set up the sprint finish, with race leader Mathias Frank trying to lead Gilbert out; 's Daniele Bennati was first to launch, but Sagan sped past to take a comfortable victory, his second of the race. Frank finished within the group, to maintain his 13-second lead over Rui Costa into the final time trial.

Stage 9
16 June 2013 — Bad Ragaz to Flumserberg, individual time trial (ITT)

With less than a minute covering the top five, the final stage was the one to decide the general classification of the 2013 Tour de Suisse. The final time trial stage was set up unconventionally, with the  itinerary split into two distinct sections. The opening  from the start in Bad Ragaz was flat, heading towards the first intermediate time-check at Flums. From there on, the route headed upwards towards the finish at Flumserberg. Such was the climb, it was expected that riders would start the stage on time-trial machinery, before stopping to change to a road bike prior to the climb. As was customary of time trial stages, cyclists set off in reverse order from where they were ranked in the general classification at the end of the previous stage.

He was not first to finish however, as he was passed by 's Alex Rasmussen on the road; Rasmussen ultimately set the benchmark at just under 62 minutes, which was almost immediately beaten by  rider Sam Bewley, who moved the fastest time towards the hour mark. Bewley's team-mate Stuart O'Grady comfortably took the fastest time several minutes later, recording a time of 57' 54" for the course. Cyril Lemoine took nearly a minute off O'Grady's time to take top spot for a period, before  rider Alexander Kristoff repeated the feat on Lemoine's time, taking the fastest time with 55' 58". His time was not threatened for the best part of half an hour, before his team-mate Gatis Smukulis bettered the target time, recording a time of 55' 35" for the course, before Daryl Impey was next to go fastest, ten seconds quicker than Smukulis. Points classification winner Peter Sagan and  team-mates Jérémy Roy and Arnold Jeannesson all enjoyed spells at the top of the timesheets, as the best time continued to tumble.

 and Jon Izagirre were next, setting a time of 53' 23", before Andrey Amador moved the target below 53 minutes, with a time ultimately bettered by only four riders. Jean-Christophe Péraud bettered Amador's time by one second to take top spot, which held into the top ten riders. 's Tanel Kangert – the final stage winner in 2012, when that edition ended with a mountain stage – took the lead from Péraud with 52' 17", which was good enough for second. The pre-stage favourite, Tejay van Garderen, faded on the course, losing almost a minute to Kangert. 's Bauke Mollema was only eight seconds off Kangert's time, while Thibaut Pinot and Roman Kreuziger of  lost more than half a minute. He was the only rider to break 52 minutes with 51' 56", and as Frank rolled across the line almost two minutes down – to finish fifth overall – Costa became the first back-to-back winner since Andrew Hampsten in 1986 and 1987. Mollema was the biggest mover among the leaders, moving from fifth to second, ahead of Kreuziger.

Classification leadership table
In the 2013 Tour de Suisse, four different jerseys were awarded. For the general classification, calculated by adding each cyclist's finishing times on each stage, and the leader received a yellow jersey. This classification was considered the most important of the 2013 Tour de Suisse, and the winner of the classification was considered the winner of the race. There was also a mountains classification, the leadership of which was marked by a red jersey. In the mountains classification, points were won by reaching the top of a climb before other cyclists, with more points available for the higher-categorised climbs; there were twenty-one categorised climbs in the race, split into five distinctive categories.

The third jersey represented the points classification, marked by a white-and-red jersey. In the points classification, cyclists got points for finishing highly in a stage. For stages 4, 5, 6 and 8, the win earned 25 points, second place earned 20 points, third 16, fourth 13, fifth 11, and one point fewer per place down to a single point for 15th. For all other stages, the win earned 15 points, second place earned 12 points, third 10, and one point fewer per place down to a single point for 12th. Points could also be earned at intermediate sprints for finishing in the top 3 at intermediate sprint points during each stage on a 6–3–1 scale.

The fourth jersey represented the sprints classification, marked by a blue jersey. In the sprints classification, cyclists received points for finishing in the top 3 at intermediate sprint points during each stage, with the exception of the individual time trial stages. There was also a classification for teams, in which the times of the best three cyclists per team on each stage were added together; the leading team at the end of the race was the team with the lowest total time.

Notes

References

External links

 

Tour de Suisse
Tour de Suisse
Tour de Suisse